Derby is an unincorporated community in Ford County, Illinois, United States. Derby is located southwest of Gibson City, and its zip code, 60936, is associated with Gibson City.

References

Unincorporated communities in Ford County, Illinois
Unincorporated communities in Illinois